The Institut des hautes études scientifiques (IHÉS; English: Institute of Advanced Scientific Studies) is a French research institute supporting advanced research in mathematics and theoretical physics. It is located in Bures-sur-Yvette, just south of Paris. It is an independent research institute in a partnership with the University of Paris-Saclay.

History
The IHÉS was founded in 1958 by businessman and mathematical physicist Léon Motchane with the help of Robert Oppenheimer and Jean Dieudonné as a research centre in France, modeled on the renowned Institute for Advanced Study in Princeton, United States.
	

The strong personality of Alexander Grothendieck and the broad sweep of his revolutionizing theories were a dominating feature of the first ten years at the IHÉS. René Thom received an invitation from IHÉS in 1963 and after his appointment remained there until his death in 2002.  Dennis Sullivan is remembered as one who had a special talent for encouraging fruitful exchanges among visitors and provoking a new and deeper insight into their ideas.

The IHÉS runs a highly regarded mathematical journal, Publications Mathématiques de l'IHÉS.

IHÉS celebrated its 40th anniversary in 1998 and its 50th in 2008.

Directors

List of faculty members

Scientists associated with the IHES 
Alain Connes (Fields Medal 1982), has been holding the Léon Motchane Chair since 1979.  Several CNRS researchers are also based at the IHES: Ahmed Abbes, Cédric Deffayet, Ofer Gabber, Fanny Kassel, and Christophe Soulé.

References

External link 

 Official website 

Mathematical institutes
Research institutes in France
Buildings and structures in Essonne
Education in Île-de-France